More of the Hard Stuff is the second studio album by The Dubliners, originally released in 1967. The line-up consists of Ronnie Drew, Luke Kelly, Barney McKenna, Ciarán Bourke and John Sheahan. True to its title, five of the songs concern hard drinking. One of the songs was written by Brendan Behan, another by his brother Dominic. The album reached number 8 in the UK album charts in 1967, and stayed in the charts for 23 weeks.

The original cover (pictured) consists of a photograph taken inside Kelly's Cellars bar in Belfast, County Antrim.

Track listing

Side one
 "Muirsheen Durkin"  (Traditional)
 "Poor Old Dicey Reilly"  (Traditional, adaptation by Dominic Behan)
 "A Nation Once Again"  (Davis)
 "Whiskey in the Jar"  (Traditional)
 "The Old Triangle"  (Brendan Behan)
 "A Pub with No Beer"  (Parsons)
 "Kelly, the Boy from Killan" (Traditional)

Side two
 "The Croppy Boy" (Traditional)
 "Sullivan's John" (*) (Pecker Dunne)
 "Come and Join the British Army" (Traditional, adaptation Dominic Behan)
 "(The Bonny) Shoals of Herring" (Ewan MacColl)
 "Mormond Braes" (Traditional)
 "Drink It Up Men" (Meek)
 "Maloney Wants a Drink" (Dominic Behan)
(*) With spoken introduction.

Charts

References 

1967 albums
The Dubliners albums
Major Minor Records albums